Krasny Yar (Qıźılyar) is a rural locality (a selo) and the administrative centre of Krasnoyarsky Selsoviet, Ufimsky District, Bashkortostan, Russia. Its population was 1,615 as of 2010. It has 20 streets.

Geography 
Krasny Yar is located 29 km north of Ufa (the district's administrative centre) by road. Gornovo is the nearest rural locality.

References 

Rural localities in Ufimsky District